Domino Lake is the 308 m long in southeast–northwest direction and 67 m wide lake on Aktinia Beach, Snow Island in the South Shetland Islands, Antarctica. It has a surface area of 1.33 ha and is separated from the waters of Boyd Strait by a 20 to 42 m wide strip of land. The area was visited by early 19th century sealers.

The feature is so named because of its shape supposedly resembling a domino mask.

Location
British mapping of the area in 1968 and Bulgarian in 2009.

Maps
 Livingston Island to King George Island. Scale 1:200000. Admiralty Nautical Chart 1776. Taunton: UK Hydrographic Office, 1968
 South Shetland Islands. Scale 1:200000 topographic map. DOS 610 Sheet W 62 60. Tolworth, UK, 1968
 L.L. Ivanov. Antarctica: Livingston Island and Greenwich, Robert, Snow and Smith Islands. Scale 1:120000 topographic map. Troyan: Manfred Wörner Foundation, 2009. 
 Antarctic Digital Database (ADD). Scale 1:250000 topographic map of Antarctica. Scientific Committee on Antarctic Research (SCAR). Since 1993, regularly upgraded and updated

Notes

References
 Bulgarian Antarctic Gazetteer. Antarctic Place-names Commission. (details in Bulgarian, basic data in English)

External links
 Domino Lake. Adjusted Copernix satellite image

Lakes of the South Shetland Islands
Bulgaria and the Antarctic